Maurice "Moe" Strauss (1897–1982) was one of the four founders of the Delaware Valley-based automotive parts retailer Pep Boys – Manny, Moe & Jack.

Biography

He was born on March 21st, 1897. After mustering out of the Navy in 1921, Strauss and three friends from World War I, Emanuel "Manny" Rosenfeld, Graham "Jack" Jackson, and Moe Radavitz, contributed $200 each to open a single auto parts supply store at 63rd & Market Streets in Philadelphia, Pennsylvania. Strauss reportedly came up with the name of the company and commissioned the Manny, Moe, & Jack caricatures that serve today as the PepBoys logo after visiting a dress shop called Minnie, Maude and Mabel's during a 1923 trip to California. Strauss served as president of the company after Rosenfeld's death from 1960 to 1973, and was a member of its board of directors until his death in 1982.

References

1897 births
American businesspeople in retailing
Businesspeople from Philadelphia
United States Navy sailors
1982 deaths
American Jews